Elections to elect all members (councillors) of Thanet District Council were held on 7 May 2015, as part of the 2015 United Kingdom local elections taking place simultaneously with the 2015 General Election. Local UK Independence Party candidates won the council, becoming the governing group, the first time UKIP had won control of any type of local government unit above the level of a civil parish council, whether London Borough, Metropolitan Borough, Unitary Authority, Non-Metropolitan Borough or a District Council.  The District has as its main towns the beach resort towns of Ramsgate, Margate and Broadstairs.

Overall Results
After the election the composition of the council is:

Results by ward
Listed below are the results in each of the 23 wards of Thanet District Council. Each ward elects 2 or 3 councilors, with the exception of Kingsgate ward, which only elects one member.

Beacon Road

Birchington North

Birchington South

Bradstowe

Central Harbour

Cliffsend and Pegwell

Cliftonville East

Cliftonville West

Dane Valley

Eastcliffe

Garlinge

Kingsgate

Margate Central

Nethercourt

Newington

Northwood

Salmestone

Sir Moses Montefiore

St Peters

Thanet Villages

Viking

Westbrook

Westgate-on-Sea

References

2015 English local elections
May 2015 events in the United Kingdom
2015
2010s in Kent